Schiehallion is a prominent cone-shaped mountain in the Breadalbane region of the Scottish Highlands, in the county of Perthshire. Schiehallion has a rich botanical life, interesting archaeology, and a unique place in scientific history for an 18th-century experiment in "weighing the Earth". It is near the centre of mainland Scotland. The mountain's popularity amongst walkers led to erosion on its footpath and extensive repairs were undertaken in 2001.

Name
The name Schiehallion comes from Scottish Gaelic Sìth Chailleann, meaning "fairy hill of Caledonia" or "-of the Caledonians". Maskelyne (1772), however, reported a translation of "constant storm", and a Lowland Scots name of "Maiden Pap".

Location
The view of the broad eastern flank attracts many visitors to the shores of Loch Tummel.

Schiehallion is sometimes described as the centre of Scotland, as it lies only 5 km west of the centre of gravity of mainland Scotland.  The folk group Gaberlunzie sang a song "The Back of Schiehallion", meaning Scotland.

Botany
The slopes of Schiehallion are rich in botanical life, with heathers, mosses and blaeberry. Blanket bog and heather moorland change colour with the seasons. The limestone pavement provides nutrients, supporting plants including dog's mercury, lily of the valley and wood anemone.

Geology
The majority of Schiehallion consists of quartzite, a rock formed from an original sand by heat and pressure. Quartzite is a white or pinkish rock, in which the dominant mineral is quartz. People often mistakenly think that Schiehallion is an extinct volcano because its shape is reminiscent of an active volcano; in fact, it was formed by sedimentary processes and the shape is the result of erosion by ice during the ice ages.

History

The slopes of Schiehallion have been inhabited and cultivated since the first millennium BC until approximately two hundred years ago. Schiehallion has been used for grazing sheep and stalking red deer.

Since 1999 the eastern side of the mountain has been owned by the John Muir Trust.

The Schiehallion experiment

Schiehallion's isolated position and regular shape led it to be selected by the English astronomer Charles Mason (of Mason–Dixon line fame) for a ground-breaking experiment to estimate the mass of the Earth in 1774. The deflection of a pendulum by the mass of the mountain provided an estimate of the mean density of the Earth, from which its mass and a value for Newton's gravitational constant G could be deduced. Mason turned down a commission to carry out the work, and it was instead coordinated by the Astronomer Royal, Nevil Maskelyne. He was assisted in the task by mathematician Charles Hutton, who devised a graphical system to represent large volumes of surveyed heights, later known as contour lines.

Footpath
A Munro mountain, Schiehallion is popular with walkers due to its accessibility, ease of ascent and views from its summit. An estimated 17,500 to 20,000 walkers made the ascent in 2000. Most walkers start from the Forestry and Land Scotland car park at Brae of Foss, which lies just outside the boundary of the John Muir Trust estate.

Ben Nevis, the highest mountain in the British Isles, can be seen to the west from the summit of Schiehallion.

By 1999, when the John Muir Trust bought the estate, the main path had become exceedingly eroded by the passage of many thousands of walkers. The scar was visible from quite a distance. The organisation therefore decided to construct a new path, following a different line, better able to handle the pressure of visitors.

In culture 

The Schiehallion oilfield in the North Atlantic is named after the mountain.

Schiehallion was the setting for the final showdown in Grant Morrison's comic series Zenith.

The Harviestoun Brewery produce a cask-conditioned lager called Schiehallion.

A Scottish country dance ("Schiehallion") and figure, the Schiehallion Reel, are both named after the mountain.

The song "Schiehallion" was featured on the 1994 album Time For A New Day by the independent band King Rizla.

Pipe Major Donald Shaw Ramsay composed a 3/4 march entitled "Schiehallion".

The England-based band "Schiehallion Pipes and Drums" (named for the Munro) led by Drum Major Jim (Jaimie) Gibb, has adopted the march as their signature tune. It is the lead-in tune on their album Hail! Schiehallion.

The Anglo-Swiss power metal band Gloryhammer features a fictional alternate-universe version of Schiehallion in the song "The Fires of Ancient Cosmic Destiny" from the album Legends from Beyond the Galactic Terrorvortex. In the song it is described as having "raging volcanic fires" in reference to the popular misconception of the mountain being a volcano. The protagonist of the album, Angus McFife XIII King of Dundee, ends his life at Schiehallion.

Gallery

External links
360Routes.com - virtual tours up to the summit of Shiehallion

See also
 List of places in Perth and Kinross
 List of mountains in Scotland
 Maiden Paps
 Breast shaped hills

Footnotes

 Computer generated summit panoramas North

Munros
Marilyns of Scotland
Mountains and hills of the Southern Highlands
Mountains and hills of Perth and Kinross
Sites of Special Scientific Interest in West Perth
One-thousanders of Scotland